Abdollah Izadpanah (born in Seydun, Khuzestan province) is a principlist representative of Izeh and Bagh-e Malek in the Islamic Consultative Assembly (the Parliament of Iran) who was elected at the 11th Majles elections on 21 February 2020 and captured about 34,000 votes.

Abdollah Izadpanah is considered as one of the 18 representatives of Khuzestan provinces at the current "Islamic Consultative Assembly" (11th parliament).

See also
 List of Iran's parliament representatives (11th term)

References

Members of the Islamic Consultative Assembly by term
Members of the 11th Islamic Consultative Assembly
Living people
Year of birth missing (living people)